The 1971 New York Mets season was the tenth regular season for the Mets, who played home games at Shea Stadium. Led by manager Gil Hodges, the team posted an 83–79 record and finished the season tied for third place in the National League East.

Offseason 
 October 20, 1970: Larry Bearnarth was purchased from the Mets by the Milwaukee Brewers.
 November 30, 1970: Joe Foy was drafted by the Washington Senators from the New York Mets in the 1970 rule 5 draft.
 January 28, 1971: Benny Ayala was signed by the Mets as an amateur free agent.
 March 30, 1971: Dean Chance and Bill Denehy were traded by the Mets to the Detroit Tigers for Jerry Robertson.
 March 31, 1971: Ron Swoboda and Rich Hacker were traded by the Mets to the Montreal Expos for Don Hahn.
 Prior to 1971 season: Frank Estrada was acquired by the Mets from the Mexico City Reds.

Regular season

Season standings

Record vs. opponents

Notable transactions 
 June 16, 1971: Jimy Williams was purchased by the Mets from the Montreal Expos.

Roster

Player stats

Batting

Starters by position 
Note: Pos = Position; G = Games played; AB = At bats; H = Hits; Avg. = Batting average; HR = Home runs; RBI = Runs batted in

Other batters 
Note: G = Games played; AB = At bats; H = Hits; Avg. = Batting average; HR = Home runs; RBI = Runs batted in

Pitching

Starting pitchers 
Note: G = Games pitched; IP = Innings pitched; W = Wins; L = Losses; ERA = Earned run average; SO = Strikeouts

Other pitchers 
Note: G = Games pitched; IP = Innings pitched; W = Wins; L = Losses; ERA = Earned run average; SO = Strikeouts

Relief pitchers 
Note: G = Games pitched; W = Wins; L = Losses; SV = Saves; ERA = Earned run average; SO = Strikeouts

Farm system 

LEAGUE CHAMPIONS: Visalia

Notes

References 
1971 New York Mets at Baseball Reference
1971 New York Mets team page at www.baseball-almanac.com

New York Mets seasons
New York Mets season
New York
1970s in Queens